Florian David Fitz (born Florian Ingo Ulrich Fitz; November 20, 1974) is a German actor, screenwriter and film director.

Filmography

Film

Television

References

External links
 

1974 births
Living people
Male actors from Munich
German male film actors
German male television actors
Mass media people from Munich
20th-century German male actors
21st-century German male actors
German Film Award winners